Elia Canakaivata (born 12 July 1996) is a Fijian rugby sevens player. He made his Commonwealth Games debut representing Fiji at the 2022 Commonwealth Games

Biography 
Canakaivata was raised up in a village called Navunisole in the Tailevu Province of Fiji. He has also represented Fijian Army and played for Fijian Army rugby sevens side. His father and elder brother died in a road accident in December 2020 in Fiji.

Career 
Canakaivata played as a flanker for Northland side in Fiji's provincial 15-a-side competition before being part of the Fijian squad for the 2017 Central Coast Sevens.

In November 2021, he made his World Sevens Series debut in Dubai. He nearly came closer to quit the sport following the family tragedies in December 2020 but his mother convinced him to continue the sport amid the struggle. In April 2022, he scored his first international try in Fijian colours during the 2022 Singapore Sevens. He would then eventually be part of Fijian lineup which won the 2022 Singapore Sevens where Fiji edged past New Zealand in the final.

Canakaivata was a vital member of the Fijian team which defeated Ireland in the final to claim the Toulouse Sevens. He was member of the Fijian squad which won Plate Championship (bronze) at the 2022 London Sevens. In June 2022, he was selected for the Oceania Rugby Super Sevens.

Canakaivata was included in the Fijian rugby sevens squad for the 2022 Commonwealth Games and was part of the national squad which claimed silver medal in the men's rugby sevens tournament where Fiji lost to South Africa 7-31 in the final. He also won a gold medal at the 2022 Rugby World Cup Sevens in Cape Town.

References 

Fiji international rugby sevens players
Male rugby sevens players
Commonwealth Games medallists in rugby sevens
Commonwealth Games silver medallists for Fiji
Rugby sevens players at the 2022 Commonwealth Games
Fijian rugby union players
Rugby union flankers
Rugby union number eights
Fijian Drua players
1996 births
Living people
Medallists at the 2022 Commonwealth Games